The Triumphal Arc was built in 1781 for the visit of Polish King Stanisław August Poniatowski to the historic city of Kamianets-Podilskyi in Khmelnytskyi Oblast (province) of western Ukraine. The arc was designed in the late Baroque style by city masters, and has survived till this day without any reconstructions. Restorations, have, however been conducted on the arc, in 1947-1948 and during the mid-1980s.

The Triumphal Arc is covered in white stone, and leads visitors into the Ss. Peter and Paul Cathedral. Above the entrance, there is an inscription reading that King Stanisław Poniatowski walked through here on November 11, 1781. The arc's columns are of the Ionic order.

References

Buildings and structures in Kamianets-Podilskyi
Triumphal arches
Buildings and structures completed in 1781